Charlotte Bascombe (born 3 January 1987) is a former Scottish woman cricketer. She represented Scotland in the 2008 Women's Cricket World Cup Qualifier.

Bascombe became the first woman cricketer to have played for a men's first XI team in Scotland.

References

External links 
 Profile at CricHQ

1987 births
Living people
Scottish women cricketers
Scottish people of English descent
Sportspeople from Newcastle-under-Lyme
Sportspeople from Staffordshire